Christiana Nkemdilim Adelana  (born 24 December 1984) popularly known as Tana Adelana, is a Nollywood actress, producer, model, TV presenter and an entrepreneur. She won the Best Supporting Actress Category of CITY People's Movie Awards 2017, and was the 2011 winner of the on Air personality of the year (TV) at the future Awards, and the 2005 Grind Awards winner. She is of Igbo descent, her family name is Egbo.

Early life 
Tana Adelana was born into a traditional Catholic royal family in the 1980s. The last in a family of ten. She attended Treasure Land Nursery and Primary School in Surulere for her primary education, and St. Francis Catholic Secondary School in Idimu, Lagos. She is an Igbo girl from Nara Unateze in Nkanu East LGA of Enugu State. Her father is no longer alive.

Education 
Tana graduated from the University of Lagos Nigeria where she obtained a B.Sc. in Urban and Regional Planning. Thereafter a diploma certificate in makeup and style from the makeup art school London (South African campus). She later attended the Metropolitan School of Business and Management United Kingdom and earned a special executive master's certificate in Leadership and Management from the Metropolitan.

Personal life 
Tana Adelana is happily married to Femi Adelana, her long-term boyfriend. The couple has been dating for 14 years and got married on 11 September 2007. The union has produced two children.

The actress admitted that she never had a formula for finding the proper partner, but she did eventually marry a decent man who loves her completely. She has managed to keep her marriage scandal-free throughout the years, and she is known for keeping her family out of the spotlight.

Info9jatv has earlier claimed that, Tana Adelana is a proud mother of two as of the publication of this article (November 2022). Little is known about her children because she withholds information about them from the media. Her daughter was born on 25 October 2009, according to sources seen by DNB Stories Africa.

Career 
Tana came into the spotlight as an OAP after auditioning for MTN Y’Hello TV Show in 2002. She is also the first Nigerian on Channel O as a TV Presenter made her introduction by acting in TV  series, Disclosure. She started her firm production, Tana Adelana Productions in July 2013. One of her movies titled Quick Sand, which features Ufuoma Ejenobor, Chelsea Eze, Wale Macaulay, Anthony Monjaro, Femi Jacobs, and other performing artists.

Awards and nominations

Filmography 
Mr. and Mrs. Revolution (2017)
Body Language (2017)
Baby daddy (2017)

References 

Nigerian female models
Nigerian businesspeople
Nigerian television actresses
University of Lagos alumni
Living people
Igbo actresses
Igbo female models
Models from Lagos
Nigerian film producers
21st-century Nigerian actresses
Nigerian film award winners
Nigerian radio presenters
Nigerian women radio presenters
Nigerian women in business
Nigerian television presenters
Nigerian women television presenters
Nigerian television personalities
1984 births